The Women's Independent Soccer League (WISL) will be a professional women's soccer league in the United States. The league was announced officially on April 8, 2021, and expected to serve as a second division.

Teams

References

 
Sports leagues established in 2021
2021 establishments in the United States
1
Professional soccer leagues in the United States